Guerino Minervino Neto (born 24 March 1950 in São Paulo), commonly known as Neto Guerino, is a Brazilian former football player who played as a striker.

Guerino played for Clube Atlético Mineiro and Nacional Futebol Clube in the Campeonato Brasileiro, before moving abroad to play in Greece.

He had a very successful career in Greece and specifically Thessaloniki, playing there for almost thirteen years. His biggest success was with PAOK FC, being a key member of the squad that won the 1976 Greek championship,  scoring 11 goals in 30 games.
In 1984, he left PAOK for Apollon Kalamarias and played for two years before retiring.

Honours

PAOK
Alpha Ethniki: 1975–76

References

External links
bio
Profile at Globo Esporte's Futpedia

1950 births
Living people
Brazilian footballers
Brazilian expatriate footballers
Clube Atlético Mineiro players
PAOK FC players
Apollon Pontou FC players
Campeonato Brasileiro Série A players
Super League Greece players
Expatriate footballers in Greece
Naturalized citizens of Greece
Greek people of Brazilian descent
PAOK FC non-playing staff
Nacional Futebol Clube players
Association football forwards
Footballers from São Paulo